Niall Wright (born 26 July 1991) is an Irish actor. He trained as a child at the Gwyneth Murdock School of Drama and studied professionally at the Bristol Old Vic Theatre School. He also studied a business degree at University College Dublin.

Wright made his debut at The Abbey Theatre, Dublin in 2015 playing the role of Joseph Swane in By The Bog Of Cats.

From 2013 to 2015, he portrayed one of the main characters on the CBBC show Dani's Castle.

In April 2017, he appeared in Jez Butterworth’s The Ferryman at the Royal Court Theatre, ahead of a transfer to the Gielgud Theatre in the West End.

In October 2018, Wright made his Broadway debut reprising his role of ‘JJ Carney’ in The Ferryman.

He is currently playing a series regular in a BBC and BritBox Original TV series called ‘Hope Street’. 
Series 1 and 2 are currently on BBC One and BritBox.

Filmography

References

External links

1991 births
Living people
Male stage actors from Northern Ireland
Male television actors from Northern Ireland
21st-century male actors from Northern Ireland
Male actors from Belfast